Veerman is a Dutch occupational surname meaning "ferryman". Variants are Veermann and Veermans. Notable people with the surname include:

Cees Veerman (born 1949), Dutch politician
Cees Veerman (musician) (1943–2014), Dutch singer and guitarist, member of The Cats
 (1980–1994), Dutch Roman Catholic bishop in Brazil
Henk Veerman (born 1991), Dutch footballer
Joey Veerman (born 1998), Dutch footballer
Pepijn Veerman (born 1992), Dutch footballer
Piet Veerman (born 1943), Dutch singer and guitarist, member of The Cats

See also
Ernest Veermann (1905–1977) né Ernst Wiermann, Estonian-Canadian Romanov impostor

References

Dutch-language surnames
Occupational surnames